Zet or ZET may refer to:
 Zagrebački električni tramvaj, Zagreb Electric Tram, public transport operator in Zagreb, Croatia
 Zet (hardware), a clone x86 processor
 Radio ZET, Polish radio station
Association of the Polish Youth "Zet", pre-1914 Polish organisation
Zet, the creator of Norwegian music project Ram-Zet
NK ZET, Croatian football club
Operation Zet, Russian support for China as part of the Sino-Soviet Non-Aggression Pact
Djet, Egyptian pharaoh
Zet, a hypocorism of the given name Suzette